Club América is a Mexican football club. It may also refer to:

Club América (Women)
Club América Premier, a Mexican football club competing in the Mexican third division.
Club América Reserves, Club América's under-15, under-17 and under-20 teams.
Club América Media, Club América's media operation.
Club América Academy, a team playing in the Southern Premier Soccer League in Houston, Texas.